Ramón Ignacio Fernández (born 3 December 1984) is an Argentine-Chilean footballer who plays for Primera B de Chile club Deportes Iquique as a midfielder.

Club career
A product of Estudiantes de la Plata youth system, Fernández joined its reserve team in January 2003 but spent most of the next five years on loan at several Argentine sides, including Sarmiento, Club Sportivo Ben Hur, Defensa y Justicia and Club Atlético Atlanta, before being loaned again to the Croatian side NK Rijeka in July 2008.

At Rijeka, he established himself as a first-team regular in his first season with the club and scored one goal in 20 appearances in the 2008–09 season. At the end of the season, the club decided to renew the loan deal into the next season. Therefore, the loan spell ended in July 2010, returning to Estudiantes subsequently.

After 10 years playing in the Chilean football, in 2022 he returned to Argentina joining Atlanta where he had been a leading figure in 2008.

In June 2022, he returned to Chile and joined Deportes Iquique in the Primera B.

Personal life
In January 2017, he acquired the Chilean nationality by residence.

Honours

Club
Estudiantes
 Torneo de Apertura (1): 2010

Universidad de Chile
 Primera División (1): Apertura 2014
 Copa Chile:  2013

Colo-Colo
Primera División (1): Transición 2017
 Copa Chile: 2016
Supercopa de Chile: 2017

References

External links
 
 Argentine Primera statistics at Fútbol XXI  
 Fernández at Football Lineups
 

1984 births
Living people
People from Formosa, Argentina
Argentine footballers
Argentine expatriate footballers
Naturalized citizens of Chile
Chilean footballers
Estudiantes de La Plata footballers
Club Atlético Sarmiento footballers
Club Sportivo Ben Hur players
Defensa y Justicia footballers
Club Atlético Atlanta footballers
HNK Rijeka players
Unión La Calera footballers
O'Higgins F.C. footballers
Universidad de Chile footballers
Colo-Colo footballers
Deportes Iquique footballers
Argentine Primera División players
Primera Nacional players
Primera B Metropolitana players
Croatian Football League players
Chilean Primera División players
Primera B de Chile players
Argentine expatriate sportspeople in Croatia
Expatriate footballers in Croatia
Argentine expatriate sportspeople in Chile
Expatriate footballers in Chile
Association football midfielders